D. californica  may refer to:
 Danthonia californica, the California oatgrass, a grass species native to two separate regions of the Americas, western North America from California to Saskatchewan and Chile
 Darlingtonia californica, the California pitcher plant, cobra lily or cobra plant, a carnivorous plant species native to Northern California and Oregon
 Descurainia californica, the Sierra tansymustard, a flowering plant species native  from California to Wyoming
 Draba californica, the California draba, a flowering plant species found in California and Nevada

Synonyms
 Dryobota californica, a synonym for Egira hiemalis, a moth species found from British Columbia south to California

See also
 List of Latin and Greek words commonly used in systematic names#C